Lev Zhurbin (born August 18, 1978 in Moscow, Soviet Union) is a composer and violist.

Biography
Lev Zhurbin immigrated to the United States in the year 1990. He is often credited simply as "Ljova", the diminutive of his formal name. He is the son of the composer Alexander Zhurbin and the poet/lyricist/writer Irena Ginzburg.
He is the author of over 70 original compositions for classical, jazz, and folk music ensembles. He has also contributed musical scores to numerous documentaries, features, shorts and animated films.
 
Zhurbin received commissions from the Louisville Orchestra, the City of London Sinfonia, a string quartet for Brooklyn Rider and a commission for Yo-Yo Ma and the Silk Road Project; arrangements for the Los Angeles Philharmonic, Brooklyn Philharmonic, tenor Javier Camarena, conductor Alondra de la Parra, songwriters Natalia Lafourcade and Ricky Martin, composer/guitarist Gustavo Santaolalla, The Knights, and collaborations with choreographers Aszure Barton, Damian Woetzel, Christopher Wheeldon, Katarzyna Skarpetowska (with Parsons Dance Company),  and Eduardo Vilaro (with Ballet Hispanico).  He is presently on the faculty of the Atelier program at Princeton University

Ljova released his debut solo CD, Vjola: World on Four Strings, in July 2006 on his own label, Kapustnik Records. "Mnemosyne", the debut album of his ensemble, Ljova and the Kontraband, featured Frank London, William Schimmel and other special guests.  His third album, "Lost in Kino", focuses on his film music, featuring Ljova's cues from collaborations with films by Francis Ford Coppola, James Marsh, Robin Hessman, Josef Astor, Lev Polyakov, Roman Khrushch, Sean Gannet and Basia Winograd.

In 2012, Ljova released his fourth album, "Melting River", featuring music created for a dance piece by choreographer Aszure Barton. It was initially released as a download-exclusive on Bandcamp, but has since been issued on limited edition vinyl with bonus tracks.

2014 saw the release of "No Refund on Flowers", the second album by Ljova and the Kontraband, crowdfunded through a 34-second campaign on Kickstarter.

2015 and 2016 saw the releases of soundtrack albums to Ljova's scores for "Finding Babel" and "Datuna: Portrait of America". 2017 saw the release of "Footwork", dedicated to Ljova's collaborations with Parsons Dance Company and Ballet Hispanico. In 2019, he released his tenth album, "SoLò Ópus", focusing on music for the fadolín and looper effects.

During 2020-2021 pandemic, he has released a number of works for the solo fadolín through his website and social media channels.

Ljova is married to Inna Barmash, an attorney and musician.

Selected Compositions

Orchestral and Soloists
2019 Cellostatus 
2017 "Pulse" 
2016 Current
2016 Elegy
2015 Throw The Book

Vocal Chamber Music
2013 The First Rite
2010 Niña Dance
2005 By the Campfire

Instrumental Chamber Music
2018 Meditation on Kol Nidrei 
2017 Clarinet Quintet: The Refugee
2016 Rockaway Baby
2015 An Appalachian Wind
2014 Gi-gue-ly
2013 Lullaby & Memory
2013 Click
2012 String Quartet: Culai
2011 Everywhere is Falling Everywhere
2005-2008 The Vjola Suite
2000 Sicilienne

Music for Solo Instruments
2020 Voices (for piano and historical recordings), an expansion of Sirota
2012 Greenway (for violin)
2011 Sirota (for piano and cantorial recording)

Music for Dance
2017 Do You Like Me Now?
2016 Atlas Kid (co-composed with Mikael Karlsson)
2015 Almah
2014 Emin
2013 Hogar
2013 Budget Bulgar (Memphis Hora)
2012 Awáa (co-composed with Curtis Macdonald)
2009 Tales of Offenbach
2009 Busk
2004 White

Filmography

Feature Film Scores
2020 Alberto and the Concrete Jungle 
2009 Black Lamb
2006 Mother
2003 Daddy
1999 Serpent's Breath

Documentary Film Scores
2019 Big Lies 
2015 Finding Babel
2015 Datuna: Portrait of America
2011 Lost Bohemia
2010 My Perestroika
2009 Alienadas
2007 Three Soldiers
2005 The Team

Short Film Scores
2017 Do You Like Me Now?
2016 How You Look At It
2015 Grace
2014 America 1979
2014 6-Minute Mom
2013 Penny Dreadful
2012 The Visitors
2012 For The Love of Nothing
2011 Fantastic Plastic
2010 Dottie's Thanksgiving Pickle
2009 American Hero
2009 Spleen
2009 The Heart of Battle
2009 The One That I Want
2008 Only Love
2008 Cupcake
2008 New People in Six Days
2007 Transience
2007 Dear Lemon Lima
2005 Dinner at Marvin's
2003 The Playground
2003 Red Wagon
2003 Gardening Tips for Housewives

Discography
 Vjola: World on Four Strings, 2006 Kapustnik Records 
 "Mnemosyne", featuring Frank London and William Schimmel  
 "Lost in Kino", (film music)
 "Melting River" 2012 
 "No Refund on Flowers" 2014 
 "Finding Babel" 2015 
 "Datuna: Portrait of America" 2016 
 "Footwork" 2017 
"SoLò Ópus" 2019 
 "Enter The Fadolín" 2022 
 "Lost in Kino 2" 2022

References

Sources
 Ljova Catalogue of Works
 Ljova Discography

External links
Ljova's Official Website
Ljova and the Kontraband, Ljova's performing ensemble.
Ljova and the Kontraband on NPR Tiny Desk Concert
Ljova's releases on Bandcamp
Ljova's releases on Soundcloud
Review of Ljova's debut solo CD in New York Times
 Zhurbin on NPR
 Zhurbin on WFMU
Inna Barmash, Ljova Zhurbin
Interview with Lev "Ljova" Zhurbin

1978 births
21st-century classical composers
American classical violists
American people of Russian descent
Living people
Russian Jews
21st-century American musicians
21st-century violists